Christóphoros is the original Greek version of Christopher, which means "Christ-bearer" or "the one who bears Christ (in his soul)". Christóforos or Christóphoros is the New Greek version of the name.

It may refer to:

Christoforos Knitis, Greek Orthodox bishop in the Metropolitan of Australia and New Zealand from 1924 to 1928
Christoforos Liontakis (born 1945), award winning Greek poet and translator
Christoforos Nezer (Bavarian) (1808–1883), Bavarian officer who settled in Greece
Christoforos Nezer (d. 1970) (1887–1970), Greek actor and cousin of Marika Nezer
Christoforos Nezer (d. 1996) (1903–1996), Greek actor and brother of Marika Nezer
Christoforos Schuff, former Greek Orthodox priest, musician and artist known for social activism, now known as Christine Harstad Schuff
Christoforos Stefanidis (born 1980), Greek basketball player
Christoforos Zografos (born 1969), Greek football referee who currently resides in Athens

See also
 Saint Christopher
 Agios Christoforos, the capital of the Agia Paraskevi municipality in the Kozani Prefecture, Greece

Greek masculine given names